The Falkland Islands was represented at the 2014 Commonwealth Games in Glasgow by 25 athletes across three sports, badminton, shooting, and lawn bowls, the largest ever Falkland Islands squad to be sent to the Commonwealth Games.

Badminton

Singles

Doubles

Mixed team

Pool D

Lawn Bowls

Men

Shooting

Men

Open

References

 Falkland Islands names largest ever squad as 25 athletes set to compete at Glasgow 2014. insidethegames.biz, 2014

Nations at the 2014 Commonwealth Games
Falkland Islands at the Commonwealth Games
2014 in the Falkland Islands